Matthew F. Lipka (born April 15, 1992) is a professional baseball player who is a free agent. He was drafted in the first round of the 2010 draft by the Atlanta Braves.

Professional career

Atlanta Braves
Lipka attended McKinney High School in McKinney, Texas. The Atlanta Braves selected Lipka in the first round (35th overall) of the 2010 MLB Draft. In 2011, the Braves had Lipka shift to center field.

Lipka played for the Lynchburg Hillcats of the Class A-Advanced Carolina League in 2013, and the Mississippi Braves of the Class AA Southern League in 2014. He returned to Mississippi to start the 2015 season. Lipka was reassigned to Mississippi to begin 2016. By mid-June, he had been promoted to Gwinnett. He finished 2016 with a .243 batting average and 3 homers. After the season, Lipka became a free agent.

Texas Rangers
On December 16, 2016, Lipka signed a minor league contract with the Texas Rangers. He split the season between the advanced Single-A Down East Wood Ducks, Double-A Frisco RoughRiders and Triple-A Round Rock Express. On November 6, 2017, Lipka elected free agency.

San Francisco Giants
On January 29, 2018, Lipka signed a minor league contract with the San Francisco Giants organization. He spent the season the Giants' Double-A affiliate, the Richmond Flying Squirrels, and became a free agent after the season.

New York Yankees
On January 11, 2019, Lipka signed a minor league deal with the New York Yankees. He received a non-roster invitation to spring training. He split the season between the Double-A Trenton Thunder and Triple-A Scranton/Wilkes-Barre RailRiders. On June 6, 2019, in a game against the Hartford Yard Goats, Lipka broke up a combined no-hitter in the top of the ninth inning with a bunt single off of Rico Garcia. The bunt caused a near fight after the game and resulted in Lipka getting death threats for the unpopular move. Lipka hit .262/.316/.388 in 89 games between the two affiliates in 2019 and became a free agent after the season.

Los Angeles Dodgers
On February 29, 2020, Lipka signed a minor league contract with the Los Angeles Dodgers. Lipka was not selected for the Dodgers player pool for the year, and did not play in a game in 2020 due to the cancellation of the minor league season because of the COVID-19 pandemic. On November 2, 2020, Lipka elected free agency.

Arizona Diamondbacks
On May 3, 2021, Lipka signed a minor league contract with the Arizona Diamondbacks organization. In 33 games between the Triple-A Reno Aces and the Double-A Amarillo Sod Poodles, Lipka slashed a cumulative .303/.364/.454 with 2 home runs and 24 RBI.

Milwaukee Brewers
On June 28, 2021, Lipka was traded to the Milwaukee Brewers in exchange for cash considerations. Lipka appeared in 70 games with the Triple-A Nashville Sounds to round out the year, hitting .285/.346/.446 with 9 home runs and 32 RBI. He elected free agency following the season on November 7.

Washington Nationals
On March 16, 2022, Lipka signed a minor league contract with the Washington Nationals.

Milwaukee Brewers (second stint)
On July 16, 2022, Lipka was traded to the Milwaukee Brewers for cash considerations. He became a free agent after the season.

References

External links

Living people
1992 births
Minor league baseball players
Baseball outfielders
Gulf Coast Braves players
Danville Braves players
Rome Braves players
Lynchburg Hillcats players
Mississippi Braves players
Gwinnett Braves players
Frisco RoughRiders players
Round Rock Express players
Down East Wood Ducks players
Richmond Flying Squirrels players
Nashville Sounds players